Iddrisu Abdallah (born 20 January 1996) is a Ghanaian football player. Abdallah has formerly played for Bechem United F.C. and won the 2016 Ghanaian FA Cup, and (2016–2017) at Oulun Palloseura.

Early career
Iddrisu began his club career with Kingdok Academy debuting in the 2005–2006 season. Prior to the beginning of the junior league in 2007–2008, Iddrisu signed for Volta Warriors Academy. He had a long spell at Golden Tulip FC also before moving in the summer transfer at Oulun Palloseura in early 2014. He later moved to Medeama S.C. in 2015–2016.

Bechem United F.C.
In January 2016 Iddrisu signed a 1,5-year deal with Bechem United F.C. with whom he won the 2016 Ghanaian FA Cup and tooted as a fan favorite.

CD Costa do Sol
After a brief stint playing in the Ghana Premier league with Bechem United, he joined Mozambican club CD Costa do Sol in January 2017 on a one-year deal. Aballah scored the only goal as CD Costa do sol beat Desportivo de Maputo 1-0 for the trophy in Maputo.

Tulsa Roughnecks
On December 31, 2018, Abdallah signed with United Soccer League side Tulsa Roughnecks ahead of 2019 season. Abdallah was released by Tulsa on July 3, 2019.

International
Iddrisu has represented the Ghana U20 two times and the  Ghana U17 four times.

Honours

Club 
Bechem United 
 2016- Ghanaian FA Cup

CD Costa do Sol
 2017- Taça de Moçambique
 2017- Moçambola- Runner Up (2nd)

Personal 
Golden Tulip FC
 2012-2013 - Second Highest Goal Scorer in the second division league  with 9 goals.
 2012-2013 - MVP award as a Youngest Best Player in the Second division league

References

External links
  Iddrisu Abdallah profile 
  Iddrisu Abdallah  
 
  Iddrisu Abdallah 

Living people
Bechem United FC players
CD Costa do Sol players
FC Tulsa players
Ghanaian footballers
1996 births
Association football forwards